The 2022 FIA World Rallycross Championship was the ninth season of the FIA World Rallycross Championship, an auto racing championship recognized by the Fédération Internationale de l'Automobile (FIA) as the highest class of international rallycross.

Johan Kristoffersson won the drivers' championship for the fifth time. Kristoffersson Motorsport won the teams' championship for the first time under that name.

Calendar 

On 15 December 2021, the provisional 2022 calendar was announced during the FIA World Motorsport Council decisions: The updated calendar was released on 21 March. It included one unconfirmed event. The calendar was updated again on 29 June on the FIA World Motorsport Council, in which World RX of Sweden was cancelled for RX1e, and World RX of Catalunya returned to the calendar provisionally. Another calendar update was announced on 7 July. The World RX of Germany was postponed to allow RX1e teams more time to prepare for the season.

Calendar Changes
World RX of Sweden was listed as the opening round of World Rallycross Championship. A further update was issued in March, with Holjes becoming an official launch event headlined by the Euro RX1 series for combustion-powered supercars. The World RallyCross Championship's electric era started at Norway's Hell track on 13-14 August after delays to allow teams to ready their new cars.

Series News 

 For the first time in world rallycross history all the categories will be based on electric power.
 The RX1 class was discontinued. It was replaced by the electric RX1e class. While bodywork and liveries will be different, all cars in this new class will be using the same powertrain developed by Kreisel Electric.
 A new race weekend format will be adopted for the 2022 season. The grids for heat 1 will now be set using a single-lap shootout SuperPole session immediately following practice. Single header events will feature three heat races (down from four), and double header events will feature two heat races (down from three). The grids for the heats following heat 1 will now be set by finishing position in the previous heat, rather than overall time. The positions per heat are still going to be determined by time. Following the heat races a 'Progression' race will determine which ten drivers move on to the semi-finals. From the semi-finals, the top 2 drivers from each semi moves on to the final, along with the highest-placed driver finishing in third. The staggered grid for the semi-finals and finals has been removed in favor of a side-by-side grid. There will be a maximum of five cars competing in every race.

Entries

RX1e

RX2e

Championship standings
Points are scored as follows:

RX1e Driver's Championship

RX1e Team's Championship

RX2e Driver's Championship

Notes

References

External links

World Rallycross Championship seasons
WRX